Goloe Pass (‘Prohod Goloe’ \'pro-hod go-'lo-e\) is the ice-covered saddle of elevation 2468 m between Enitsa Peak and Bruguière Peak on the side ridge that trends 9.15 km northeastwards from Mount Giovinetto on the main crest of north-central Sentinel Range in Ellsworth Mountains, Antarctica.  It is part of the glacial divide between Rumyana Glacier to the southeast and Delyo Glacier to the northwest.

The pass is named after the ancient and medieval fortress of Goloe in Southeastern Bulgaria.

Location
US mapping in 1961 and 1988.

Maps
 Vinson Massif.  Scale 1:250 000 topographic map.  Reston, Virginia: US Geological Survey, 1988.
 Antarctic Digital Database (ADD). Scale 1:250000 topographic map of Antarctica. Scientific Committee on Antarctic Research (SCAR). Since 1993, regularly updated.

Notes

References
 Goloe Pass. SCAR Composite Gazetteer of Antarctica.
 Bulgarian Antarctic Gazetteer. Antarctic Place-names Commission. (details in Bulgarian, basic data in English)

External links
 Goloe Pass. Copernix satellite image

Ellsworth Mountains
Bulgaria and the Antarctic
Mountain passes of Ellsworth Land